The Bible and Quran have many characters in common, many of which are mentioned by name, whereas others are merely referred to. This article is a list of people named or referred to in both in the Bible and the Quran.

Identified by name in the Quran

Not identified by name in the Quran
Sarah, Hagar, Zipporah, Elizabeth, Raphael, Cain and Abel, Korah, Joseph's brothers, Potiphar and his wife, Eve, Jochebed, Samuel, Noah's sons, and Noah's wife are mentioned, but unnamed in the Quran.

In Islamic tradition, these people are given the following names:

See also
 Biblical and Quranic narratives
 Table of prophets of Abrahamic religions
 Biblical names and their Arabic equivalent

References

Bibliography 
 

Quran

Bible